Ivor Germain (8 July 1923 – 1982) was a Barbadian professional light/welterweight boxer of the 1940s and 1950s who won the Barbados lightweight title, and British Empire lightweight title, his professional fighting weight varied from , i.e. lightweight to , i.e. welterweight.

Germain died in Manchester, England in 1982.

References

External links

Image - Ivor Germain

1923 births
1982 deaths
Barbadian male boxers
Lightweight boxers
Welterweight boxers